Oscar William Adams, Jr. (February 7, 1925 – February 15, 1997) was the first African-American Alabama Supreme Court justice and the first African American elected to statewide office in Alabama (including the Reconstruction era).

Early life, education, and career
Adams was born in Birmingham, Alabama to Oscar William Adams Sr. (editor of the Birmingham Reporter) and Ella Virginia Eaton. Adams was a 1940 graduate of A. H. Parker High School. He went on to earn a bachelor's degree in philosophy at Talladega College in 1944, and a law degree at Howard University in Washington D. C. in 1947.  He was admitted to the Alabama Bar that year and launched a private practice, specializing in civil rights cases, often on behalf of Fred Shuttlesworth's Alabama Christian Movement for Human Rights based in Birmingham. During 1963's Birmingham Campaign, Adams was a member of the Central Committee that met at the A. G. Gaston Motel to plan demonstrations.

In 1966, Adams was the first African American to join the Birmingham Bar Association. In 1967, he partnered with white attorney Harvey Burg to form the state's first integrated legal practice. The firm he later founded with James Baker and U. W. Clemon (Adams, Baker and Clemon) was one of the foremost law firms to litigate Civil Rights cases in the 1960s and 1970s.

Judicial service
Adams was appointed to the Alabama Supreme Court on October 10, 1980, by Governor Fob James. He won re-election in 1982 and 1988. He taught classes in appellate and trial advocacy at Samford University's Cumberland School of Law. He retired from the bench on October 31, 1993, in order to spend time writing a memoir. Governor Folsom appointed Ralph Cook to finish his term.

Personal life and death
Adams married Willa Ingersoll in 1949, with whom he fathered three children (Gail, Oscar III and Frank). Willa died in 1982 of breast cancer, and Adams later remarried.

Adams died from an infection related to cancer at Baptist Medical Center in Birmingham at age 72. He was survived by his children, ten grandchildren, and his second wife Anne-Marie. Gadsden's Oscar W. Adams Elementary School was named in his honor in 1983. He was inducted into the Alabama Lawyers Hall of Fame in 2005 and to the Birmingham Gallery of Distinguished Citizens in 2008.

F. H. Threatt (died 1931), who held various public offices in North Carolina, was Adams great-grandfather.

See also
List of African-American jurists

References

External links
 Oscar W. Adams, Jr, profile at "Alabama Moments in American History". Alabama Department of Archives and History

1925 births
1997 deaths
20th-century African-American people
20th-century American judges
20th-century American lawyers
Activists for African-American civil rights
Activists from Birmingham, Alabama
African-American judges
African-American lawyers
Alabama lawyers
American civil rights lawyers
Deaths from cancer in Alabama
Howard University School of Law alumni
Justices of the Supreme Court of Alabama
Lawyers from Birmingham, Alabama
Samford University people